Holothuria sanctori is a species of sea cucumber in the genus Holothuria.

References

Holothuriidae
Animals described in 1823